Eberhard Frederich Ferdinand Hopf (April 4, 1902 in Salzburg, Austria-Hungary – July 24, 1983 in Bloomington, Indiana, USA) was a mathematician and astronomer, one of the founding fathers of ergodic theory and a pioneer of bifurcation theory who also made significant contributions to the subjects of partial differential equations and integral equations, fluid dynamics, and differential geometry. The Hopf maximum principle is an early result of his (1927) that is one of the most important techniques in the theory of elliptic partial differential equations.

Biography
Hopf was born in Salzburg, Austria-Hungary, but his scientific career was divided between Germany and the United States. He received his Ph.D. in mathematics in 1926 and his Habilitation in mathematical astronomy from the University of Berlin in 1929.

In 1971, Hopf was the American Mathematical Society Gibbs Lecturer. In 1981, he received the Leroy P. Steele Prize from the American Mathematical Society for seminal contributions to research.

See also
 Hopf bifurcation
 Hopf decomposition
 Hopf lemma
 Hopf maximum principle
 Hopf–Cole transformation 
 Landau–Hopf theory of turbulence
 Wiener–Hopf method

Major publications 

A non-comprehensive selection of his work was published in 2002:

Notes

External links

 Online list of E. Hopf's works from Göttinger Digitalisierungszentrum

1902 births
1983 deaths
Scientists from Salzburg
20th-century German mathematicians
Topologists
Austrian emigrants to Germany
German emigrants to the United States